The men's 1500 meter at the 2013 KNSB Dutch Single Distance Championships took place in Heerenveen at the Thialf ice skating rink on Saturday 10 November 2012. Although this tournament was held in 2012 it was part of the speed skating season 2012–2013. There were 24 participants.

Statistics

Result

Source:

Draw

References

Single Distance Championships
2013 Single Distance